The 1916 United States Senate election in Maine was held on September 11, 1916. 

Incumbent Democratic Senator Charles F. Johnson ran for re-election to a second term in office, but was defeated by Republican Frederick Hale, the son of Johnson's predecessor Eugene Hale.

Democratic primary

Candidates
 Charles F. Johnson, incumbent Senator since 1911

Results
Senator Johnson was unopposed in the Democratic primary.

Republican primary

Candidates
Bert M. Fernald, former Governor of Maine (1909–11)
Frederick Hale, former State Representative from Portland (1905–06) and Republican National Committeeman
Ira Hersey, State Senator from Houlton and President of the Maine Senate

Results

Three days before the primary, Maine's other U.S. Senator Edwin C. Burleigh died. After losing this primary, Fernald ran to complete Burleigh's unexpired term and won.

Hersey ran for and won the election to Maine's 4th congressional district, which was vacated by Frank E. Guernsey, who also ran in the special election for Senate.

Socialist primary

Candidates
James F. Carey, former Massachusetts State Representative from Haverhill (1900–04)

Results

Progressive primary

Candidates
George C. Webber

Results

General election

Results

See also 
 1916 United States Senate elections

References 

1916
Maine
United States Senate